A blemish is a minor flaw or imperfection.

Blemish may refer to:
 Acne, skin imperfections
 Blemish (album), a music album from David Sylvian released in 2003

See also 
 Flaw (disambiguation)
 Imperfect (disambiguation)